Chris Anthony Wolfe is an Indian professional footballer who plays as a midfielder for Indian Arrows in the I-League.

Career

Chris Wolfe made his first professional appearance for Indian Arrows on 10 January 2021 against Churchill Brothers as Substitute on 90th minute.

Career statistics

References

2003 births
Living people
Indian footballers
Association football midfielders
Indian Arrows players
I-League players
Footballers from Karnataka